Hilton is a township in the Canadian province of Ontario, comprising the southeast quadrant of St. Joseph Island in the Algoma District. It surrounds, but does not include, the independent village of Hilton Beach.

Demographics 

See also
List of townships in Ontario

References

External links

Municipalities in Algoma District
Single-tier municipalities in Ontario
St. Joseph Island (Ontario)
Township municipalities in Ontario